Trảng Bàng is a town in Tây Ninh Province, in the Southeast region of Vietnam. It has a traditional artisan industry, and recently has opened an industrial zone for foreign investment. This town has a famous food called  bánh canh Trảng Bàng, a kind of pork noodle soup and "Trảng Bàng dew-wetted rice paper", served with boiled pork, local herbs and Vietnamese fish sauce.

Outside Vietnam it is most famous for the iconic and Pulitzer Prize-winning image of a nude Phan Thi Kim Phuc (who had torn off her burning clothes to survive the attack) and other Vietnamese children fleeing an accidental napalm bombing by Republic of Vietnam airplanes on the village of Trảng Bàng alongside ARVN soldiers.  The image was taken by the photographer Nick Ut.

Cuisine
A pork noodle soup dish called bánh canh Trảng Bàng is served there.

As of 2003 the district had a population of 150,716. The district covers an area of  338 km². The district capital lies at Trảng Bàng.

References

Districts of Tây Ninh province
County-level towns in Vietnam